, also known as simply , is a Japanese manga series by Kiichi Nagakubo. Its first two volumes were adapted to an animated feature film in 1989 and an OVA series in 1990 respectively.

The series has been considered one of the first and greatest works in the "occult action" manga genre, as well as the onmyoji fiction genre popular in Japan. After finishing its run in 2018, it was followed by a prequel series, Sukuna o Koroshita Kami-hen, in 2020.

Plot
For centuries, Japan has been protected by the Ōgi family, a hereditary clan of exorcists who fight the supernatural forces of evil under the protection of their patron deity Karura. Born in the 38th generation of this family, twin sisters Shoko and Maiko are endowed with the powers of the Scroll of Heaven and the Scroll of Earth, which allow them to see and banish wicked spirits. Aided by fellow spiritualist Kenmochi and government agent Nishikiori, they pose as transfer students to fight evil.

Characters

The wisest of the sisters, Shōko possesses the Scroll of Heaven and the ability to perceive spiritual forces. She is calm and intelligent and has black hair. Her sister calls her by the nickname of "Shii-chan".

A high school slacker, Maiko is the most energetic of the sisters. She has the Scroll of Earth and the power to banish spirits. She has red hair and excels at sports, being a black belt in aikido.

The sisters' grandmother and leader of their family. Although officially retired, she helps them with her guide and power in moments of need.

A powerful onmyoji who works as a suave acupuncturist in his daily life. Nicknamed , he is a secret descendant of Abe no Seimei and persecutes those who abuse magic for bad purposes. He wields special needles named .

Chikae is a serious, polite student with spiritual abilities and a background in kenpo. The sisters met him in their first mission in Nara, covered in the anime film, where Chikae's father had been murdered through a curse. Afterwards, he joins the team and becomes Kenmochi's apprentice. He has feelings for Maiko.

Nishikiori is a veteran police agent working for the Cabinet Intelligence and Research Office. Though initially skeptical of magic, he is in charge of cases related to the supernatural, and often acts as the sisters' liaison and bodyguard.

An onryo from the Nara period. She was found by the sisters in their first mission and became their ally, sometimes protecting them from other spirits in their missions. She can be summoned from a small stone sphere.

Chikae's half brother, he was involved with conspiracy that murdered their father, as he planned to use them to kill their mother as well for his own reasons. Later defected and followed his own way, becoming a sporadic ally to the team, albeit developing a rivalry with Kenmochi.

References

External links

1989 anime films
Toei Animation original video animation
1986 manga
1990 anime OVAs
Akita Shoten manga
Asahi Sonorama manga